The Chiquitibum is a chant heard at Mexican sporting events. The Chiquitibum/Siquitibum cheer goes as follows: "Chiquitibum a la bim bom ba, chiquitiboom a la bim bom ba, a la bio, a la bao, a la bim bom ba, Mexico Mexico, Rah rah rah!!!" This most famous of Mexican cheers appeared at Mexican League and university soccer games during the late 1920s.

"La Chica Chiquitibum"
During the 1986 FIFA World Cup, hosted in Mexico City, Chiquitibum became associated with Spanish-born model and actress Mar Castro when she appeared in a Carta Blanca beer commercial featuring the chant. For the next four years, she toured Mexico, sponsored by the brewery.

References

Sport in Mexico
Football songs and chants